Bellevue Rural Historic District is a national historic district located near Forest, Bedford County, Virginia. It encompasses seven contributing buildings, five contributing sites, and one contributing structure.  They are associated with the Bellevue School for Boys, Trivium, Brook Hill Farm, and Glenn Mary Farm properties.  Brook Hill Farm and Bellevue are also listed separately on the National Register of Historic Places.

It was listed on the National Register of Historic Places in 2005.

References

Farms on the National Register of Historic Places in Virginia
Historic districts in Bedford County, Virginia
National Register of Historic Places in Bedford County, Virginia
Historic districts on the National Register of Historic Places in Virginia
1790 establishments in Virginia